Goran Čabrilo (born 1 July 1958) is a Serbian chess player who holds the titles of Grandmaster (GM) (1995).

Biography
Goran Čabrilo several times took part in the individual Yugoslav Chess Championship finals. His best result in these tournaments - twice 5th place (1989, 1990). In 1989, in Nea Makri Goran Čabrilo taking the leading place in the Zonal Tournament and was promoted to the Interzonal Tournament. In 1990 in Manila he participated in the World Chess Championship Interzonal Tournament where shared 40th - 47th place.

Goran Čabrilo is winner of many international chess tournaments, including winning or sharing first place in Trnava (1981), Subotica (1992), Vršac (2006), Belgrad (2008).

Goran Čabrilo played for Yugoslavia-3 team in the Chess Olympiads:
 In 1990, at second  board in the 29th Chess Olympiad in Novi Sad (+4, =3, -3).

Goran Čabrilo played for Yugoslavia in the Men's Chess Balkaniad:
 In 1990, at fifth board in the 21st Chess Balkaniad in Kavala (+1, =4, -1) and won team gold and individual bronze medal.

In 1980, he was awarded the FIDE International Master (IM) title and in 1995 received the FIDE Grandmaster (GM) title.

References

External links

Goran Čabrilo chess games at 365Chess.com

1958 births
Serbian chess players
Yugoslav chess players
Chess grandmasters
Chess Olympiad competitors
Living people